Raffaele Bastoni (15 May 1925 – 17 November 1992) was an Italian sprint canoer, born in Rome, who competed in the early 1950s. He finished 17th in the K-2 10000 m event at the 1952 Summer Olympics in Helsinki.

References
Raffaele Bastoni's profile at Sports Reference.com
Report on Italian Olympic canoeists 

1925 births
1992 deaths
Sportspeople from Rome
Canoeists at the 1952 Summer Olympics
Italian male canoeists
Olympic canoeists of Italy
20th-century Italian people